David Kantilla (1938 – 13 June 1978, traditional name Amparralamtua) was an Australian rules footballer who is recognised as the first Indigenous Australian to play in the South Australian National Football League and the first Tiwi Islander to successfully play in a southern football league. Throughout his footballing career he was known by his 'Anglo' name David Kantilla but also had his tribal name of Amparralamtua.

Kantilla was born on Bathurst Island. Standing at 196 cm, Kantilla played as a ruckman for a couple of seasons with St Mary's in the Northern Territory Football League (NTFL) before joining South Australian National Football League (SANFL) club South Adelaide for the 1961 season and had an immediate impact, kicking six goals against Glenelg Football Club on debut and winning the club's best and fairest award in his first two seasons.

Nicknamed "Soapy" following the publication of a photograph showing him lathered in soap in a bath, Kantilla was then moved back into the ruck, becoming a member of South Adelaide's premiership side in 1964 and by the time he left the club at the end of the 1966 season he had played 113 games. During his time in South Australia he represented the state at interstate football on four occasions, in 1964 and 1965. After returning to the Northern Territory, Kantilla captain-coached St Mary's in the 1968/69 NTFL season.

Kantilla's brothers Bertram and Saturninus were members of the inaugural St Mary's team in 1952/53.

In 1978 Kantilla was killed in a car accident at Wurrumiyanga on Bathurst Island.

Honours
In 1997 Kantilla was inducted into the Northern Territory Hall of Champions, the function room at NTFL headquarters at Marrara Oval is named for him, and in 2005 Kantilla was named on the interchange bench in the Indigenous Team of the Century. He is also a member of the South Adelaide Football Club Hall of Fame.

Sources
 Tatz, C. & Tatz, P. (2000) Black Gold: The Aboriginal and Islander Sports Hall of Fame, Aboriginal Studies Press: Canberra. .
 Tiwi Islands Football League (2013) The Tiwi Islands, Tiwi Islands Football League, Wurrumiyanga.

References

External links

1938 births
1978 deaths
South Adelaide Football Club players
Indigenous Australian players of Australian rules football
St Mary's Football Club (NTFL) players
Tiwi Islands people
Australian rules footballers from the Northern Territory
Road incident deaths in the Northern Territory